Saint Margaret of Scotland, also known as Margaret of Wessex, was an English princess and a Scottish queen. Margaret was sometimes called "The Pearl of Scotland". Born in the Kingdom of Hungary to the expatriate English prince Edward the Exile, Margaret and her family returned to England in 1057. Following the death of King Harold II at the Battle of Hastings in 1066, her brother Edgar Ætheling was elected as King of England but never crowned. After she and her family fled north, Margaret married Malcolm III of Scotland by the end of 1070.

Margaret was a very pious Christian, and among many charitable works she established a ferry across the Firth of Forth in Scotland for pilgrims travelling to St Andrews in Fife, which gave the towns of South Queensferry and North Queensferry their names. Margaret was the mother of three kings of Scotland, or four, if Edmund of Scotland (who ruled with his uncle, Donald III) is counted, and of a queen consort of England.

In 1250, Pope Innocent IV canonised her, and her remains were reinterred in a shrine in Dunfermline Abbey in Fife, Scotland. Her relics were dispersed after the Scottish Reformation and subsequently lost. Mary, Queen of Scots, at one time owned her head, which was subsequently preserved by Jesuits in the Scots College, Douai, France, from where it was lost during the French Revolution.

Early life
Margaret was the daughter of the English prince Edward the Exile and his wife Agatha, and also the granddaughter of Edmund Ironside, King of England. After the death of Ironside in 1016, Canute sent the infant Edward and his brother to the court of the Swedish king, Olof Skötkonung, and they eventually made their way to Kiev. As an adult, he travelled to Hungary, where in 1046 he supported the successful bid of King Andrew I for the Hungarian crown. The provenance of Margaret's mother, Agatha, is disputed, but Margaret was born in Hungary about 1045. Her brother Edgar the Ætheling and sister Cristina were also born in Hungary around this time. Margaret grew up in a very religious environment in the Hungarian court.

Return to England
Margaret came to England with the rest of her family when her father, Edward the Exile, was recalled in 1057 as a possible successor to her great-uncle, the childless King Edward the Confessor. Whether from natural or sinister causes, her father died immediately after landing, and Margaret, still a child, continued to reside at the English court where her brother, Edgar Ætheling, was considered a possible successor to the English throne. When Edward the Confessor died in January 1066, Harold Godwinson was selected as king, possibly because Edgar was considered too young. After Harold's defeat at the Battle of Hastings later that year, Edgar was proclaimed King of England, but when the Normans advanced on London, the Witenagemot presented Edgar to William the Conqueror, who took him to Normandy before returning him to England in 1068, when Edgar, Margaret, Cristina, and their mother Agatha fled north to Northumbria, England.

Journey to Scotland
According to tradition, the widowed Agatha decided to leave Northumbria, England with her children and return to the continent. However, a storm drove their ship north to the Kingdom of Scotland, where they were shipwrecked in 1068. There they were given refuge by King Malcolm III.  The locus where it is believed that they landed is known today as St Margaret's Hope. Margaret's arrival in Scotland, after the failed revolt of the Northumbrian earls, has been heavily romanticised, though Symeon of Durham implied that her first meeting of Malcolm III may not have been until 1070, after William the Conqueror's Harrying of the North. Other sources say they met 9 years before. According to Orderic Vitalis, one of Malcolm's earliest actions as king was to travel to the court of Edward the Confessor in 1059 to arrange a marriage with "Edward's kinswoman Margaret, who had arrived in England two years before from Hungary". If a marriage agreement was made in 1059, it was not kept, and this may explain the Scots invasion of Northumbria in 1061 when Lindisfarne was plundered.

King Malcolm III was a widower with two sons, Donald and Duncan, and would have been attracted to marrying one of the few remaining members of the Anglo-Saxon royal family. The marriage of Malcolm and Margaret occurred in 1070. Subsequently, Malcolm executed several invasions of Northumberland to support the claim of his new brother-in-law Edgar and to increase his own power. These, however, had little effect save the devastation of the county.

Progeny
Margaret and Malcolm had eight children – six sons and two daughters:
 Edward, killed along with his father in the Battle of Alnwick
 Edmund
 Ethelred, abbot of Dunkeld, Perth and Kinross, Scotland
 Edgar, king of Scotland, reigned 1097–1107
 Alexander I, King of Scotland, reigned 1107–24
 Edith, renamed Matilda, queen of England
 Mary (1082–1116), countess of Boulogne
 David I, king of Scotland, reigned 1124–53

Piety

Margaret's biographer Turgot of Durham, Bishop of St. Andrew's, credits her with having a civilizing influence on her husband Malcolm by reading him narratives from the Bible. She instigated religious reform, striving to conform the worship and practices of the Church in Scotland to those of Rome. This she did on the inspiration and with the guidance of Lanfranc, a future archbishop of Canterbury. She also worked to conform the practices of the Scottish Church to those of the continental Church, which she experienced in her childhood. Due to these achievements, she was considered an exemplar of the "just ruler", and moreover influenced her husband and children, especially her youngest son, the future King David I of Scotland, to be just and holy rulers.

"The chroniclers all agree in depicting Queen Margaret as a strong, pure, noble character, who had very great influence over her husband, and through him over Scottish history, especially in its ecclesiastical aspects. Her religion, which was genuine and intense, was of the newest Roman style; and to her are attributed a number of reforms by which the Church [in] Scotland was considerably modified from the insular and primitive type which down to her time it had exhibited. Among those expressly mentioned are a change in the manner of observing Lent, which thenceforward began as elsewhere on Ash Wednesday and not as previously on the following Monday, and the abolition of the old practice of observing Saturday (Sabbath), not Sunday, as the day of rest from labour (see Skene's Celtic Scotland, book ii chap. 8)." The later editions of the Encyclopædia Britannica, however, as an example, the Eleventh Edition, remove Skene's opinion that Scottish Catholics formerly rested from work on Saturday, something for which there is no historical evidence. Skene's Celtic Scotland, vol. ii, chap. 8, pp. 348–350, quotes from a contemporary document regarding Margaret's life, but his source says nothing at all of Saturday Sabbath observance, but rather says St. Margaret exhorted the Scots to cease their tendency "to neglect the due observance of the Lord's day."

She attended to charitable works, serving orphans and the poor every day before she ate and washing the feet of the poor in imitation of Christ. She rose at midnight every night to attend the liturgy. She successfully invited the Benedictine Order to establish a monastery in Dunfermline, Fife in 1072, and established ferries at Queensferry and North Berwick to assist pilgrims journeying from south of the Firth of Forth to St. Andrew's in Fife. She used a cave on the banks of the Tower Burn in Dunfermline as a place of devotion and prayer. St. Margaret's Cave, now covered beneath a municipal car park, is open to the public. Among other deeds, Margaret also instigated the restoration of Iona Abbey in Scotland. She is also known to have interceded for the release of fellow English exiles who had been forced into serfdom by the Norman conquest of England.

Margaret was as pious privately as she was publicly. She spent much of her time in prayer, devotional reading, and ecclesiastical embroidery. This apparently had considerable effect on the more uncouth Malcolm, who was illiterate: he so admired her piety that he had her books decorated in gold and silver. One of these, a pocket gospel book with portraits of the Evangelists, is in the Bodleian Library in Oxford, England.

Malcolm was apparently largely ignorant of the long-term effects of Margaret's endeavours, not being especially religious himself. He was content for her to pursue her reforms as she desired, which was a testament to the strength of and affection in their marriage.

Death
Her husband Malcolm III, and their eldest son Edward, were killed in the Battle of Alnwick against the English on 13 November 1093. Her son Edgar was left with the task of informing his mother of their deaths. Not yet 50 years old, Margaret died on 16 November 1093, three days after the deaths of her husband and eldest son. The cause of death was reportedly grief. She was buried before the high altar in Dunfermline Abbey in Fife, Scotland. In 1250, the year of her canonization, her body and that of her husband were exhumed and placed in a new shrine in the Abbey. In 1560, Mary Queen of Scots had Margaret's head removed to Edinburgh Castle as a relic to assist her in childbirth. In 1597, Margaret's head ended up with the Jesuits at the Scots College, Douai, France, but was lost during the French Revolution. King Philip of Spain had the other remains of Margaret and Malcolm III transferred to the Escorial palace in Madrid, Spain, but their present location has not been discovered.

Veneration

Canonization and feast day

Pope Innocent IV canonised St. Margaret in 1250 in recognition of her personal holiness, fidelity to the Roman Catholic Church, work for ecclesiastical reform, and charity. On 19 June 1250, after her canonisation, her remains were transferred to a chapel in the eastern apse of Dunfermline Abbey in Fife, Scotland. In 1693 Pope Innocent XII moved her feast day to 10 June in recognition of the birthdate of the son of James VII of Scotland and II of England. In the revision of the General Roman Calendar in 1969, 16 November became free and the Church transferred her feast day to 16 November, the date of her death, on which it always had been observed in Scotland. However, some traditionalist Catholics continue to celebrate her feast day on 10 June.

She is also venerated as a saint in the Anglican Communion. Margaret is honored in the Church of England and in the Episcopal Church on 16 November.

Institutions bearing her name

Several churches throughout the world are dedicated in honour of St Margaret. One of the oldest is St Margaret's Chapel in Edinburgh Castle in Edinburgh, Scotland, which her son King David I founded. The Chapel was long thought to have been the oratory of Margaret herself, but is now thought to have been established in the 12th century. The oldest edifice in Edinburgh, it was restored in the 19th century and refurbished in the 1990s.

See also
List of Catholic saints
List of Scottish consorts
St Margaret's Chapel, Edinburgh
Queen Margaret College, Glasgow, former college in Glasgow that merged with Glasgow University
Queen Margaret Union, Glasgow student union at Glasgow University
Saint Margaret of Scotland, patron saint archive

References

Notes

Citations

Sources

 
Duncan, A.A.M., The Kingship of the Scots 842–1292: Succession and Independence. Edinburgh University Press, Edinburgh, 2002. ISBN 0-7486-1626-8

Oram, Richard, David I: The King Who Made Scotland. Tempus, Stroud, 2004. ISBN 0-7524-2825-X
Ritchie, R. L. Graeme, The Normans in Scotland, Edinburgh University Press, 1954

Further reading
Chronicle of the Kings of Alba
Anderson, Marjorie O. (ed.). Kings and Kingship in Early Scotland. 2nd ed. Edinburgh, 1980. 249-53.
Hudson, B.T. (ed. and tr.). Scottish Historical Review 77 (1998): 129–61.
Anderson, Alan Orr (tr.). Early Sources of Scottish History: AD 500–1286. Vol. 1. Edinburgh, 1923. Reprinted in 1990 (with corrections).
Turgot of Durham, Vita S. Margaritae (Scotorum) Reginae.
Ed. and trans. Catherine Keene, in Saint Margaret, Queen of the Scots: A Life in Perspective, New York, 2013, Appendix: Translation of the Dunfermline Vita, pp. 135–221.
Ed. J. Hodgson Hinde, Symeonis Dunelmensis opera et collectanea. Surtees Society 51. 1868. 234-54 (Appendix III).
tr. William Forbes-Leith, SJ, Life of St. Margaret, Queen of Scotland by Turgot, Bishop of St Andrews. Edinburgh, 1884. PDF available from the Internet Archive. Third Edition. 1896.
Trans. anon., The Life and Times of Saint Margaret, Queen and Patroness of Scotland. London, 1890. PDF available from the Internet Archive.
William of Malmesbury, Gesta regum Anglorum.
Ed. and trans. R. A. B. Mynors, R. M. Thomson, and M. Winterbottom, William of Malmesbury. Gesta Regum Anglorum. The History of the English Kings. OMT. Vol 1. Oxford, 1998.
Orderic Vitalis, Historia Ecclesiastica
Ed. and trans. Marjorie Chibnall, The Ecclesiastical History of Orderic Vitalis. 6 vols. OMT. Oxford, 1968–80.
John of Worcester, Chronicle (of Chronicles).
Ed. B. Thorpe, Florentii Wigorniensis monachi chronicon ex chronicis. 2 vols. London, 1848-9.
Trans. J. Stevenson, Church Historians of England. Vol. 2.1. London, 1855. P. 171–372.
John Capgrave, Nova Legenda Angliae
Acta Sanctorum Vol. 2, June, 320. London, 1515. 225.

Secondary literature

Baker, D. "A Nursery of Saints: St Margaret of Scotland Reconsidered." In Medieval Women, ed. D. Baker. SCH. Subsidia 1. 1978.
Bellesheim, Alphons. History of the Catholic Church in Scotland. Vol 3, trans. Blair. Edinburgh, 1890. pp. 241–63.
Butler, Alban. Lives of the Saints. 10 June.
Challoner, Richard. Britannia Sancta, I. London, 1745. P. 358.
 Dunlop, Eileen, Queen Margaret of Scotland, 2005, NMS Enterprises Limited – Publishing, Edinburgh, 978 1 901663 92 1.
Huneycutt, L.L. "The Idea of a Perfect Princess: the Life of St Margaret in the Reign of Matilda II (1100–1118)." Anglo-Norman Studies, 12 (1989): pp. 81–97.
Madan. The Evangelistarium of St. Margaret in Academy. 1887.
Parsons, John Carmi. Medieval Mothering. 1996.
Olsen, Ted. Kristendommen og Kelterne Forlaget. Oslo: Forlaget Luther, 2008. (P. 170). . Norwegian.
Skene, W.F. Celtic Scotland. Edinburgh.
Stanton, Richard. Menology of England and Wales. London, 1887. P. 544.
Wilson, A.J. St Margaret, Queen of Scotland. 1993.

External links

 
The Heraldry of Queensferry, which provides the best information and images, interspliced throughout the page, on St. Margaret's arms and their variations.
University of Pittsburgh: Margaret of Scotland
Catholic Encyclopedia: St. Margaret of Scotland
Medieval Women: The Life Of St Margaret, Queen Of Scotland   By Turgot, Bishop of St Andrews Ed. William Forbes-Leith, S.J. Third Edition. Edinburgh: David Douglas, 1896 . Retrieved 14 March 2011.

1040s births
1093 deaths
Year of birth uncertain
11th-century Christian saints
11th-century English people
11th-century English women
11th-century Scottish people
11th-century Scottish women
Anglo-Saxon royal consorts
Anglo-Saxon saints
Burials at Dunfermline Abbey
English philanthropists
English princesses
Female saints of medieval England
Female saints of medieval Scotland
House of Dunkeld
House of Wessex
Medieval English saints
Medieval Scottish saints
Roman Catholic royal saints
Scottish Roman Catholic saints
Scottish royal consorts
Anglican saints
Royal reburials